Wieser is a surname. Notable people with the surname include:

 Frances Wieser (1868–1949), American scientific illustrator
 Friedrich von Wieser (1851–1926), Austrian economist
 Neesha Wieser (born 1986), New Zealand netball player
 Roland Wieser (born 1956), East German racewalker
 Sandro Wieser (born 1993), Liechtensteiner footballer
 Matthäus Wieser (1617–1678), German songwriter
 Al W. Wieser, Jr. (born 1949), American politician and businessman

See also
Weiser (disambiguation)

German-language surnames